Filippians or Philippians  was a soglasiye (confession, literally, "agreement") of the Bespopovtsy (the "priestless") strain of  Old Believers. They detached themselves from Pomortsy under the leadership of a "teacher" Filipp at the beginning of the 18th century. Because of the repressions of the government, they started practicing self-immolation as a means for the "preservation of the faith". In the second half of the 18th century, their fanaticism decreased, and several other confessions were spun off: Aaronovtsy (Aaron's Confession), Shepherd's Confession (пастухово согласие), and many others.

Old Believer movement
Christian denominations established in the 18th century